Stephon is a masculine given name. Notable people with the name include:

Stephon Alexander (born 1971), Trinidadian-born American theoretical physicist, cosmologist, musician and author
Stephon Clark (1995–2018), American man shot dead by police
Stephon Gilmore (born 1990), American football player
Stephon Heyer (born 1984), American football player
Stephon Marbury (born 1977), American basketball player and coach
Stephon Morris (born 1991), American football player
Stephon Tuitt (born 1993), American football player
Stephon Williams (born 1993), American professional ice hockey player

Masculine given names